Mayda (variously known as Maida, Mayd, Mayde, Brazir, Mam, Asmaida, Asmayda, Bentusle, Las Maidas Bolunda and Vlaanderen) is a non-existent island in the North Atlantic that has been shown on several published maps at various points in history. It was most often represented as being crescent-shaped and its position has varied widely over time. Early maps drew the island west of Brittany and southwest of Ireland, but it later moved towards the Americas (Newfoundland, Bermuda, West Indies).

History
The island first appeared under the name of Brazir, on the Pizigani brothers' 1367 map. It was crescent-shaped and sited southwest of the island of Brasil, on the same latitude of southern Brittany.

It appeared as Asmaidas on a map of the New World accompanying Waldseemüller's 1513 edition of Ptolemy's Geography.

Ortelius (in Theatrum Orbis Terrarum) placed a crescent-shaped island in the traditional location of Mayda with the name "Vlaenderen" ("Flanders").

Submerged land of the appropriate shape has been found in the area of early maps at a depth of 20 fathoms (120 ft; 36.5 m) which suggested to one author that Mayda may have existed.

The island is the namesake of Mayda Insula, an island in the Kraken Mare on Saturn's moon Titan.

Appearances on maps
Pizigani brothers map (1367) as Brazir
Catalan map (1375) as Mam
Pinelli map (1384) as Jonzele/I.Onzele
 Pizzigano Map (1424) either as Ventura or Ymana.
Bianco world map (1448) as Bentusla
Waldseemüller map (1513) as Asmaidas 
Prunes map (1553) as Mayda
Nicolay map (1560) as I man orbolunda

In popular culture
The island of Mayda is a principal location in the novel A Web of Air by Philip Reeve.

Notes

References

Phantom islands of the Atlantic
Islands of the North Atlantic Ocean